Penicillium thymicola is a halotolerant species of fungus in the genus Penicillium which produces okaramine A, daldinin D, alantrypinone, seranttrypinone, fumiquinazoline F and fumiquinazoline G.

References

Further reading 
 
 
 

thymicola
Fungi described in 2004